The 1894–95 season was Stoke's sixth season in the Football League.

Stoke's league struggles continued in the 1894–95 season as they were almost relegated but survived after winning five out the final six matches. This meant that Stoke played a test match against Second Division side Newton Heath which the "Potters" won 3–0 to preserve their First Division status.

Season Review

League
Stoke had a poor 1894–95 season and by the end of February 1895 they looked destined for relegation. However Stoke made it in to the end of season test match with a remarkable run of five victories and a draw in their final six fixtures. Goal average just favoured West Bromwich at the foot of the table who finished a position higher. In the test match Stoke were paired with Newton Heath the venue being nearby Burslem, Stoke, backed by over 3,000 fans won 3–0, two goals coming from Joe Schofield, who was for the fourth season running was leading goalscorer, on this occasion jointly with Billy Dickson.

That late recovery was largely fuelled by the signing of Sunderland's Scottish forward, Tommy Hyslop who scored seven goals in seven games including a hat-trick on his debut against Derby County. Hyslop went on to be capped for Scotland whilst at Stoke becoming the clubs's first Scottish international.

FA Cup
Stoke exited the FA Cup at the Second Round again this time losing 2–0 away at Staffordshire rivals Wolverhampton Wanderers.

Final league table

Results

Stoke's score comes first

Legend

Football League First Division

Test match

FA Cup

Squad statistics

References

Stoke City F.C. seasons
Stoke